The 2002 Australian Super Touring Car Series was a CAMS sanctioned motor racing competition open to Super Touring Cars. It was the tenth running of an Australian series for Super Touring Cars and the second to be contested under the Australian Super Touring Series name. The series began on 24 March 2002 at Oran Park Raceway and ended on 24 November 2002 at Oran Park Raceway after five rounds.  It would be the final season for such touring cars until the 2019 TCR Australia Touring Car Series, which is a contemporary take on the four-cylinder touring car formula.

Future Touring Cars
The grids for the 2002 championship were bolstered with cars from the Future Touring Car category. This category, which catered for V8 powered cars that had competed previously in AUSCAR racing, made its debut in a support event to the 1999 Bathurst 500. While the Future Touring Cars and the Super Touring Cars raced together in the same events, drivers competed for two separate titles with separate points scoring for each category.

Teams and drivers
The following teams and drivers competed in the 2002 Australian Super Touring Championship.

Race Calendar
The 2002 Australian Super Touring Championship was contested over a five-round series, with three races held each round.

Results

Drivers Championship

See also
 2002 Australian Touring Car season

References

External links
 2002 Racing Results Archive

Australian Super Touring Championship
Super Touring Car Championship